Poa novarae is a species of flowering plant in the family Poaceae (grasses), native to Saint Paul Island.

References

novarae
Flora of the Amsterdam and Saint Paul islands
Plants described in 1871